Frederick William Nicholls Crouch (30 July 1808 – 18 August 1896) was an English composer and cellist.

Biography
Crouch was born in Marylebone in London. He emigrated to the United States in 1849 and settled in Richmond, Virginia. During the Civil War, Crouch took up arms for the Richmond Grays and the 1st Richmond Howitzers, Confederacy.

Crouch was noted as a fine cellist, having played in the King's Theatre as well as St Paul's Cathedral in London, before relocating to the United States, but the majority of his compositions were not successful. His most famous song is "Kathleen Mavourneen". During his years in the United States, Crouch composed two operas and unsuccessfully tried various musical undertakings (i.e., conducting, singing and teaching). Well traveled after the Civil War, Crouch eventually settled in Baltimore, Maryland.

He was married four times, and was the father of 27 children, including the famous French courtesan Cora Pearl.

He died on 18 August 1896 in Portland, Maine, and was buried on Confederate Hill in Baltimore's Loudon Park Cemetery.

References

External links

[ Frederick Nicholls Crouch on allmusic]

English Romantic composers
English classical composers
English classical cellists
1808 births
1896 deaths
19th-century classical composers
English male classical composers
19th-century English musicians
19th-century British composers
19th-century British male musicians
Burials at Loudon Park Cemetery
20th-century cellists